"I Don't Need" is a song written by Ike Turner. It was released by R&B duo Ike & Tina Turner on Modern Records in 1965.

Release 
"I Don't Need" was Ike & Tina Turner's second release on the newly revived Modern label. Tina Turner promoted the record on Shindig! in August 1965. The single reached No. 134 on Billboard's Bubbling Under The Hot 100. Turner also performed the B-side "Gonna Have Fun" on Hollywood A Go-Go in September 1965. "I Don't Need" and "Gonna Have Fun" later appeared on the compilation album The Soul of Ike & Tina (1966), which was released on Modern's follow-up label, Kent Records, and on The Kent Years (2000).

Track listing

Chart performance

References 

1965 songs
1965 singles
Ike & Tina Turner songs
Modern Records singles
Songs written by Ike Turner
Song recordings produced by Ike Turner